The Welsh Ladies Indoor Bowling Association (WLIBA) (formed 1950) is the governing body for the indoor bowling clubs in Wales. It has 25 affiliated clubs. The WLIBA organise national competitions and select and manage the national side.

The Welsh Ladies Indoor Bowling Association is based at Ton Pentre, Rhondda Cynon Taf.

See also
Welsh Bowls Federation
Welsh Bowling Association
Welsh Crown Green Bowling Association
Welsh Indoor Bowls Association
Welsh Short Mat Bowls Association
Welsh Women’s Bowling Association

References

External links
Official website

Bowling
Bowls in Wales
1950 establishments in Wales
Bowling